Devil's Courthouse is a mountain in the Appalachian Mountains of western North Carolina in the United States of America. The mountain is located at the Western edge of the Pisgah National Forest about 10 miles (16 kilometers) northwest of Brevard and 28 miles (45 kilometers) southwest of Asheville.  Located at milepost 422.4 (kilometer 679.8 km) of the Blue Ridge Parkway, the Devil's Courthouse has a moderate/strenuous trail climbing a half mile to its peak where panoramic views can be seen.

Myth of Judaculla

Cherokee lore had been reported to state that Jutaculla (alternative English spelling is Judaculla; Cherokee name is Tsul'kălû'), a slant eyed giant, dwells in the cave in Devil's Courthouse.  However James Mooney, the Cherokee anthropologist, 100 years earlier located Jutaculla to Tanasee Bald where Haywood, Jackson, and Transylvania counties meet. Tanasee Bald is 1.5 miles (2.4 km) southwest. Unconfirmed rumors state that the Cherokee used the formation as a platform for capital punishment.

References

External links

Mountains of North Carolina
Protected areas of Transylvania County, North Carolina
Landmarks in North Carolina
Locations in Native American mythology
Pisgah National Forest
Blue Ridge Parkway
Mountains of Transylvania County, North Carolina